The Limousin horse was a French breed of horse. It is now extinct.

References 

Extinct horse breeds